Elizabeth Pipko (born June 26, 1995) is an American author, model, media personality, and political operative. She is a first generation American, whose family came from the former Soviet Union.

Career 
Pipko was signed to Wihemina Models at age 17. She has appeared in Maxim, Harper's Bazaar, Grazia, DT, Esquire, Contrast, and L’officiel, and in the early stages of her career she was often compared to Emily Ratajkowski, with many noting their similar appearances. In 2018, she appeared in the "Perfectly Imperfect" campaign for Vizcaya Swimwear, an anti-photoshop campaign promoting positive body image.

Pipko has stated that her political work interfered in her modeling career. In an interview and spread in QP Magazine in 2019 she said “This is about showing young girls that they can do anything they want to do. From modeling to politics, and everything in between.”

In December 2021, Elizabeth Pipko was featured on the cover of Harper's Bazaar Vietnam.

In February 2022, when asked for her thoughts on the war in Ukraine, Pipko told Fox news, "I have heard people ask, ‘Why should we care about what is going on in Russia and Ukraine today?’ We as Americans know what we stand for, and we know that an attack on democracy anywhere is an attack on democracy everywhere. It’s that simple," she said.

In January 2023, Pipko launched the Lest People Forget project, a crypto-technology global Holocaust remembrance platform to fight anti-Semitism and holocaust denial inspired by remarks made by Kanye West. She stated that she imagines the site as an interactive virtual Holocaust museum, and a place where students who do not live near a Holocaust museum can explore and learn. The site offers the ability for anyone to become involved in preserving the materials of the Holocaust.

She told The Algemeiner, that the Lest People Forget project aims to modernize and “decentralize” education about the Holocaust.

Pipko has written opinion pieces on the topic of antisemitism for Fox News, the Jewish Voice, and Newsweek.

Elizabeth regularly appears across cable television programs to speak on topics from pop culture to politics.

Author 
Pipko published two books of poetry: Sweet Sixteen (2013) and About You (2018).

In 2020, Pipko's book Finding My Place: Making My Parents' American Dream Come True (2020) was released through Post Hill Press.

Political 
In 2016, Pipko was employed on Donald Trump's 2016 campaign For President as a volunteer services coordinator.

In 2019, Pipko was a spokesperson for The Exodus Movement — originally named Jexodus (an apparent portmanteau of "Jewish" and "Exodus") but quickly renamed —  and incorporated it as a tax exempt organization. The Exodus Movement is an initiative of Red Sea Rising, a 501c4 organization.

She told OK! magazine "When I got thrown into the political world, I knew the only way for me to both survive and thrive would be to create something meaningful. So I put my efforts into fighting for the Jewish people an against anti-Semitism."

On fighting injustices in our country, Pipko told Fox News, "It's very easy to find problems going on right now in our society. No one's going to deny that things are upside down. I'm fighting anti-Semitism every single day. I still get swastikas sent to my direct messages once a week. I think when supporting America, in my eyes, it's more patriotic of me to stand against those things because I know America doesn't stand for that," she said.

Personal 
Pipko is a first generation American and the granddaughter of Soviet-born American artist Marc Klionsky. She was a competitive figure skater until the age of fifteen when an ankle injury took her out of the sport. Pipko is Jewish and attended Rabbi Arthur Schneier's Park East Day School. On December 26, 2018, Pipko married Darren Centinello in West Palm Beach, Florida at the Mar-A-Lago Club.

Pipko is a graduate of the Harvard Extension School at Harvard University. She is currently pursuing a master's degree at the School of Social Policy and Practice at the University of Pennsylvania.

References

External links

Project website

1995 births
Living people
American writers
American female models
Harvard Extension School alumni
People from Brooklyn
People from Florida
Jewish activists
Jewish female models
21st-century American women